Acanthodis is a genus of katydids belonging to the family Tettigoniidae.

The species of this genus are found in Southern America.

Species:

Acanthodis aquilina 
Acanthodis chipmani 
Acanthodis curvidens 
Acanthodis longicauda 
Acanthodis tessellata 
Acanthodis unispinulosa

References

Tettigoniidae